The Samsung Wave 533 (or Samsung S5330), was launched on October 26, 2010 alongside the Samsung Wave 525. Both hardware and software-wise, the S5330 and Samsung Wave 525 are identical except for the inclusion of a pop-out keyboard on the Samsung Wave 533. The phone initially launched with a price of €150 ($210).

Specifications

Body 
The phone body is made of plastic, with the screen and keyboard portions of the phone being separated by a chrome ring. The screen portion of the phone has 3 buttons: the menu button, and a send and end button, which are marked with a phone and a phone with a bar in between the two earpieces respectively. The keyboard portion of the phone has volume control buttons on the left side, and a dedicated camera activation button on the right along with a lock/power button. The phone was available in 3 colors: black, white, or pink.

Screen 
The screen is a TFT LCD display that measures 3.2 inches along the diagonal, and a total surface area of 29.1 . The surface area gives it a screen-to-body ratio of 48.4%. The screen has a resolution of 240x400 pixels, a 5:3 aspect ratio, a pixel density of ~146 ppi, and can display 256K colors. The display has a capacitive touchscreen which allows menu interaction without use of the keyboard or menu button. The menu UI for this phone was the TouchWiz 3.0.

Hardware 
The phone has a single-core processor running at 312 MHz. There is a base amount of storage of 100 MB, which is upgradable with a 16 GB microSD via the phone's microSD port, allowing for up to 16.1 GB total storage.

Camera 
The phone has a 3.15 MP (2048 x 1536 4:3) camera, which is centered at the top of the phone. The phone can also shoot video at 320p at 15fps.

Battery 
The phone has a rechargeable 1200 mAh Lithium Ion battery, which allows for 1090 hours of standby time or 14 hours of talk time (both measured while connected to a 2G network). The phone can be charged via micro USB.

Connectivity 
The phone has WiFi 4, Bluetooth 3.0, Stereo FM Radio, A-GPS, and a microUSB 2.0 port. It has 2G connectivity and can tap into GSM frequency bands 850/900/1800/1900.

Operating system 
The phone has Bada OS 1.1 pre-installed, with continued support until Bada OS 2.0. TouchWiz 3.0 provides a user interface for phone interaction.

Other features 
 Multi-touch zoom
 Integrated Contacts
 Integrated Calendar
 Samsung App Suite
 Unified inbox
 Dolfin 2.0 Browser with partial support for HTML 5
 Geo-tagging
 Accelerometer
 Smart Search

References 

Wave 533